Israel Katz ( Yisrael Katz, born 21 September 1955) is an Israeli politician and member of the Knesset for Likud who currently serves as the minister of National Infrastructure, Energy, and Water. He was a member of the Security Cabinet of Israel. He has previously held the posts of Minister of Agriculture, Minister of Transportation, Minister of Intelligence, Minister of Foreign Affairs and Minister of Finance.

Early life
Israel Katz was born in Ashkelon to Meir and Malka Katz. His parents Meir Katz and his mother Malka (Nira), born Deutsch were Holocaust survivors from the region of Maramureș, Romania. He was raised on moshav Kfar Ahim. He drafted into the IDF in 1973. He volunteered as a paratrooper in the Paratroopers Brigade. He served as a soldier and a squad leader. In 1976 he became an infantry officer after completing Officer Candidate School and returned to the Paratroopers Brigade as a platoon leader. After his discharge in 1977, he studied at the Hebrew University of Jerusalem, and graduated with a BA and an MA from the Hebrew University of Jerusalem. While studying at the Hebrew University in the early 1980s, he was chairman of the students' union. In March 1981, he was suspended for a year over his participation in violent activities to protest Arab violence on campus, including imprisoning rector Raphael Mechoulam in his room as a protest.

Political career
Katz won 34th place on the Likud-Gesher-Tzomet list for the 1996 elections, but missed out on a place in the Knesset when the alliance won only 32 seats. However, he entered the Knesset in November 1998 as a replacement for Ehud Olmert. He was re-elected in 1999 and 2003, and was appointed Minister of Agriculture in Ariel Sharon's government in 2003. Katz left the cabinet in January 2006 after the Likud–Kadima split, and was re-elected in the 2006 elections.

In January 2004, Katz announced a plan to substantially increase the number of settlers in the Golan Heights. In March 2004, he suggested making a referendum among all registered members of Likud, which allowed Ariel Sharon, intent on mobilising public opinion to back his Gaza disengagement plan, to get round opposition within the Likud convention, dominated by Israeli settler pressure groups. Katz along with Benjamin Netanyahu, Silvan Shalom and Limor Livnat announced that they would resign from the government within two weeks if Sharon did not agree to hold a national referendum on the pull out plan. In the same period, he lobbied, together with the World Zionist Organization, to have $32 billion set aside to provide incentives and subsidies for settlements in the West Bank.

In March 2007, the Israel Police recommended indicting Katz on charges of fraud and breach of trust linked to political appointments at the Ministry of Agriculture during his tenure as minister. The report found 24 seasonal ministry employees were members of the Likud Central Committee or were children of committee members. The police transferred their investigative material to the central district prosecution, which subsequently declined to prosecute. 

Katz ran for Leader of the Likud in December 2005, winning 8.7% of the vote.

In the 2009 elections and after winning 11th place on the Likud list, Katz retained his seat and was appointed Minister of Transportation in the Netanyahu government. In July 2009, he decided to replace existing road signs in Israel with new ones so that all the names appearing on them in English and Arabic would be a direct transliteration of their Hebrew names, instead of being directly in English and Arabic.

In February 2010, Katz was ordered by the High Court of Justice to issue instructions based on a committee's findings that gender segregation in public buses was illegal and that separate seating could not be coerced, as Haredis were doing. Katz, undertaking to implement the recommendations, responded that the buses could carry signs suggesting that gender segregation was voluntary. The Haredi community considered this failure of enforcement a victory. Judges from the High Court of Justice criticized Katz's decision to allow continued operation of sex-segregated buses.

In July 2011, Katz confirmed that the state subsidizes bus tickets within West Bank settlements, causing them to be cheaper than tickets for rides within the Green Line. According to Katz, the move was intended to incentivize settlers to use armor-protected public transportation within the West Bank, which would ostensibly reduce state spending on stationing military and security escorts for non-armored, private vehicles.

Katz was re-elected in 2013 and remained Minister of Transportation in the new government. After being placed fourth on the Likud list, he was re-elected in 2015, after which he was appointed Minister of Intelligence in the new government, as well as remaining Minister of Transportation.

In February 2019, Katz assumed the position of Minister of Foreign Affairs.

On 17 May 2020, Katz became Minister of Finance when the Thirty-fifth government of Israel was sworn in.

Views

Peace and security
On peace and security matters, Katz is considered to be a hardliner in the Israeli government. He takes an annexationist view of the West Bank: he supports continued settlement construction, extending full Israeli sovereignty to the West Bank, and severing all relations with the Palestinian Authority. He opposes the two-state solution and the creation of a Palestinian state in any form, which he regards as unacceptable considering "our rights to this land". Instead, Katz favors the creation of an autonomous Palestinian entity "with Jordanian civil and political affiliation", and connecting the Gaza Strip to Egypt. He opposes any territorial retreat from the Golan Heights, captured from Syria during the Six-Day War, deeming it "an integral part of Israel and vital for its security and protection."

Terrorism and deterrence
In the aftermath of the 2016 Brussels bombings, Katz caused some controversy when he made "harsh" comments on Israel Radio about the inability of Belgium and the Western world to fight Islamic terrorism effectively. The Jerusalem Post quoted Katz as saying that, "The first rule of war is know your enemy, and Europe and the current American government are unwilling to define this war as against Islamist terrorism. If in Belgium they continue eating chocolate and enjoying life, and continue to appear as great democrats and liberals, they won't be aware that some Muslims in their country are organising terror, they won't be able to fight them." The "chocolate-eating Belgians" remark was widely quoted in the Western media and ridiculed on Twitter, and Katz was accused of giving Israel a bad image abroad as a result.

In March 2016, Katz introduced a bill to the Knesset to enable the Israeli government to deport the families of terrorists, if they are found to have been aware of, to have encouraged, or to have aided the act. The measure received broad support from the ruling coalition and key opposition MKs.

In March 2016, Katz argued that Israel should employ "targeted civil eliminations" against leaders of Boycott, Divestment and Sanctions (BDS). The expression puns on the Hebrew word for targeted assassinations.

Polish people
During an interview on Israeli TV, Katz quoted Yitzhak Shamir by saying that Poles "suckled anti-Semitism from their mothers' breasts," allegedly causing Polish Prime Minister Mateusz Morawiecki to cancel his visit to Israel in February 2019. Morawiecki said the remarks were "unacceptable" and "racist".

Erdogan
In August 2014, after Turkey's Prime Minister Recep Tayyip Erdogan accused Israel of attempting a "systematic genocide" of Palestinian Arabs in Gaza, on account of Israel's Operation Protective Edge military campaign, Katz publicly reminded Erodgan of the 1915 Armenian genocide, rejecting any accusations for defending Israel against those he termed Erdogan's "friends in the Islamic movement".

Personal life
Israel Katz is married and has two children.

See also 
List of Likud Knesset members

References

External links

1955 births
Living people
People from Ashkelon
Hebrew University of Jerusalem alumni
Likud politicians
Ministers of Agriculture of Israel
Israeli Jews
Israeli people of Hungarian-Jewish descent
Israeli people of Romanian-Jewish descent
Israeli people of Latvian-Jewish descent
Members of the 14th Knesset (1996–1999)
Members of the 15th Knesset (1999–2003)
Members of the 16th Knesset (2003–2006)
Members of the 17th Knesset (2006–2009)
Members of the 18th Knesset (2009–2013)
Members of the 19th Knesset (2013–2015)
Members of the 20th Knesset (2015–2019)
Members of the 21st Knesset (2019)
Members of the 22nd Knesset (2019–2020)
Ministers of Foreign Affairs of Israel
Members of the 23rd Knesset (2020–2021)
Members of the 25th Knesset (2022–)
Ministers of Finance of Israel
Ministers of Intelligence of Israel